Yue Yuan (born July 23, 1987) is a Chinese beach volleyball player. She competed alongside Wang Fan in the women's beach volleyball tournament in the 2016 Summer Olympics.

References

External links
 
 
 
 

1987 births
Living people
Chinese female beach volleyball players
Olympic beach volleyball players of China
Asian Games medalists in beach volleyball
Asian Games silver medalists for China
Asian Games bronze medalists for China
Beach volleyball players at the 2010 Asian Games
Beach volleyball players at the 2014 Asian Games
Beach volleyball players at the 2016 Summer Olympics
Medalists at the 2010 Asian Games
Medalists at the 2014 Asian Games